Jean Randrianjatovo is a Malagasy Olympic long-distance runner. He represented his country in the men's 5000 meters at the 1964 Summer Olympics. His time was a 15:50.4.

References

1936 births
Living people
Malagasy male long-distance runners
Olympic athletes of Madagascar
Athletes (track and field) at the 1964 Summer Olympics